Barthélémy Rosso, a/k/a Mimi Rosso (b. Monaco, d. 1971), was a French guitarist and arranger of jazz and classical music. Although he played occasionally with Sidney Bechet, he is best known today for having worked with Léo Ferré and Georges Brassens.

References

1971 deaths
Date of death missing
Place of death missing
Year of birth missing
French jazz guitarists
Jazz arrangers
Monegasque musicians